Kloehn is a surname. Notable people with the surname include:

Gregory Kloehn, American artist
Silas J. Kloehn (1902–1985), American orthodontist